Okon castle (Armenian: Օկոնի ամրոց), is a castle in Armenia.

Location 
It is located 25 km West of Yenokavan in the Tavush Region of Armenia. It is 1600–1700 meters above sea level.

Architecture
Okon castle is a semicircular structure, with walls  3 meters thick. The southern and western parts of the castle are 20 meters from the surrounding walls and were initially constructed as a second line of defense. The southwestern corner of the castle's walls have 5-meter high towers.

Sources
 Ellaryan, the  Aghstev  the  Valley  of  historical  and  cultural  monuments,  Yerevan,  Armenia,  1980,  33–36,  has erased  33-36 - 154  pages.

Castles in Armenia
Forts in Armenia